Hassbach or Haßbach may refer to:

 Haßbach (Ruhr), a tributary of the Ruhr in North Rhine-Westphalia, Germany
 Haßbach (Lower Austria), a locality of the town Warth, Lower Austria